The anaerobic clarigester is a form of anaerobic digester. It is regarded as being the ancestor of the upflow anaerobic sludge blanket digestion (UASB) anaerobic digester. A clarigester treats dilute biodegradable feedstocks and separates out solid and hydraulic (liquid) retention times. A diagram comparing the UASB, anaerobic clarigester and anaerobic contact processes can be found  here.

See also
 Anaerobic digestion
 Anaerobic digester types
 Biogas
 Expanded granular sludge bed digestion
 List of wastewater treatment technologies
 Upflow anaerobic sludge blanket digestion

References

Anaerobic digester types